Stewart Harris Bradley (born November 2, 1983) is a former American football linebacker in the National Football League (NFL). He was drafted by the Philadelphia Eagles in the third round of the 2007 NFL Draft and also played for the Arizona Cardinals. He played college football at Nebraska.

Early years
Bradley played just one season of football as a junior at Highland High School in Salt Lake City, Utah,  due to injuries, starting at safety. He also starred in rugby and won 3 straight national championships with the Highland Club in Salt Lake City.

College career
Bradley was a three-year starter at the University of Nebraska as a strong-side linebacker and in 43 games, registered 175 tackles, 25 TFLs, 4 sacks, 3 FFs, 4 FRs, and 1 INT, which he returned 43-yds for a touchdown. He enrolled at Nebraska in 2002, spending the season as a defensive end on the scout team. In 2003, he appeared in all thirteen games as a reserve left defensive end, moving to that position after playing at middle linebacker in preseason camp. He managed only six tackles (4 solos) with three stops for losses and four pressures as an edge rusher. He also earned Academic All-Big Twelve Conference honors. He made the move to strong-side linebacker in 2004 and finished 2nd on the team with 67 tackles after serving as a reserve defensive end the previous two seasons.  He missed most of the 2005 campaign with torn ACL in left knee but finished with 26 tackles (11 solos), three sacks and five stops for losses and added seven quarterback pressures and returned an interception 43 yards for a touchdown. Bradley led the Cornhuskers in tackles with 76 (6 for losses) in 2006 and also added 1 sack, 3 FF, and 4 FR.

Professional career

Philadelphia Eagles
Bradley was drafted by the Philadelphia Eagles in the third round of the 2007 NFL Draft.

On December 23, 2007 Bradley had his first sack, and first interception in an Eagles win over the New Orleans Saints in the Superdome.  Bradley finished with six tackles, one sack and one interception.  During the game, he also essentially single-handedly stopped the Saints from scoring from inside the five-yard line four plays in a row. Bradley became the first player in NFL history to start in his first NFL game and make his first interception and first sack at the same time.

In 2007, Bradley was a solid reserve linebacker and key special teams performer in his rookie campaign, finishing 2nd on the team in special teams tackles (17) and 3rd in special teams production points (257).

Sheldon Brown, a starting cornerback for the Browns said that Bradley reminded him of Brian Urlacher in terms of his body type and athletic ability.

On January 6, 2009, Bradley was named to the 2008 Sports Illustrated All-Pro team in only his first year as a starter.

Bradley tore his ACL during Eagles Flight Night, a night where fans can watch the players practice at Lincoln Financial Field, before the 2009 season on August 2, 2009. He was placed on injured reserve on September 1, and missed the entire season.

Arizona Cardinals
Bradley was signed by the Arizona Cardinals on July 29, 2011. In a move to gain salary cap relief, Bradley was cut on March 1, 2013.

Denver Broncos
Bradley was signed by the Denver Broncos on March 13, 2013. He was placed on injured reserve by the Broncos on August 31, 2013, ending his season.

Personal
On February 6, 2009, New York Magazine reported that Bradley is following in the footsteps of the now infamous Sean Avery and has accepted an internship at Elle Magazine. Stewart is married to Hailey Hernandez from Sacramento, California.

References

External links

Arizona Cardinals bio
Philadelphia Eagles bio
Nebraska Cornhuskers bio

1983 births
Living people
Players of American football from Salt Lake City
American football linebackers
Nebraska Cornhuskers football players
Philadelphia Eagles players
Arizona Cardinals players
Denver Broncos players
Rugby union players that played in the NFL
American rugby union players
Sportspeople from Salt Lake City